Kobunsha ( Kōbunsha) is a Japanese publishing company. It publishes literature, manga novels, and women's magazines.

Company history
Kobunsha was established on October 1, 1945, and belongs to the Kodansha group.

The company has published Japanese authors such as Tetsuya Honda, Keigo Higashino, Jiro Akagawa, Miyuki Miyabe and Arimasa Osawa and foreign authors such as Arthur C. Clarke, Jean Genet, Malcolm Gladwell, Jon Ronson, J. D. Vance, Hanya Yanagihara and Zhao Ziyang.

In 1975, Kobunsha published the women's magazine JJ, known as the earliest established women's magazine for college students in Japan.  

From 1994 it established the Kobun Foundation and publishing more mystery novels. The Foundation has been awarding a Grand Prize for Best Mystery Novels each year.

Kobunsha currently publishes women's magazines such as JJ, Classy and JJ Bis.

Books and magazines published by Kobunsha

Women's magazines
 JJ
 Bis—a version of JJ magazine targeted at women aged between 15 and 19.
 Classy—a version of JJ magazine targeted at women aged between 24 and 28.
 Very
 Story
 Mart
 Josei Jishin

Men's magazines
 Gainer
 Brio
 Pro Wrestling Album

Other magazines
 Giallo
 Flash
 Shousetsu Houseki

Magazines no longer published
 Hoseki
 Shukan Hoseki
 VS.

Literary book series
 Chie No Mori Bunko
 Kappa Novels
 Kobunsha Bunko (English, "Kobunsha Paperback Library")
 Kobunsha Koten Shin'yaku Bunko (光文社古典新訳文庫) (English, "Kobunsha New Translations of Classics Library") (2006)
 Kobunsha Paperbacks
 Kobunsha Shinsho (English, "Kobunsha New Books [i.e. trade paperback]")

Manga 
  Koubunsha Girl Comic Series 
  Koubunsha BL Comic Series 
  Hinotama Game Comic Series

Manga anthologies 
  Megane de Suit
  BL Shouji Shinnyuu Shainsan Irasshai!! 
  Shinsengumi anthology Hana to Ran

See also
 Kodansha

References

External links
 Kobunsha 
 Kobunsha 

 
Book publishing companies of Japan
Magazine publishing companies of Japan
Publishing companies established in 1945
Japanese companies established in 1945